Ladislav Brožek (born 1952) is a Slovak astronomer. At the Bohemian Kleť Observatory, he discovered a total of 23 minor planets between 1979 and 1982, as credited by the Minor Planet Center.

One of his discoveries, the main-belt asteroid 2613 Plzeň, he named after his birthplace Plzeň (Pilsen). In 1981, he discovered 3102 Krok, a near-Earth object of the Apollo group. He also named another of his discoveries, 3834 Zappafrank, in memory of rock musician and composer Frank Zappa (1940–1993).

List of discovered minor planets

See also

References 
 

1952 births
20th-century astronomers
Discoverers of asteroids

Living people
Slovak astronomers